Iskushta (İsquştı) is a rural locality (a selo) in Assinsky Selsoviet, Beloretsky District, Bashkortostan, Russia. The population was 195 as of 2010. There are 5 streets.

Geography 
Iskushta is located 141 km northwest of Beloretsk (the district's administrative centre) by road. Muldakayevo is the nearest rural locality.

References 

Rural localities in Beloretsky District